Feel the Burn is the debut album by Blackburner. It features the electro-dubstep based tracks "Freak You" and "Pumped Up Kicks".

Track listing
 "East Death Bunny" (Blackburner) – 4:20 
 "Dust Eater" (Blackburner) – 3:58 
 "Back In Black" (Brian Johnson/Angus Young/ Malcolm Young) – 4:06 
 "Feel the Burn" (Blackburner) – 3:33 
 "Tony Montana" (Blackburner) – 4:02
 "Kashmir [Acid Particle Mix]" (John Bonham/Jimmy Page/Robert Planet ) – 4:06 
 "The Devil Is Real" (Skyla Talon) – 4:10 
 "Adagio Glitch" (Blackburner) – 4:56 
 "Prometheus" (Blackburner) – 4:08 
 "Freak You" (Blackburner) – 5:14
 "Pumped Up Kicks [genXocide Mix]" (Mark Foster) – 5:00
 "World of Dreams" (Blackburner) – 4:04
 "Disambiguation" (Blackburner) – 4:26

Personnel

The band
 Skyla Talon – guitar 
 John Wesley – guitar (guest artist)
 Edgar Froese – keyboards  (guest artist)
 Sister Alice – vocals (guest artist)

Production
 Skyla Talon – Mastering
 Brian Perera – Executive Producer

References

External links

2012 debut albums
Blackburner albums
Cleopatra Records albums